Lesbian, gay, bisexual, transgender, and queer (LGBTQ) persons in the U.S. state of Missouri as of late have most of the same legal rights as non-LGBT persons have, but nonetheless face some legal challenges not experienced by other residents throughout the state, excluding St. Louis, Kansas City, and Columbia. Same-sex sexual activity is legal in Missouri.

Missouri recognizes same-sex marriages. A state court ruling striking down Missouri's same-sex marriage ban ordered the City of St. Louis to issue marriage licenses to same-sex couples. St. Louis County and Jackson County also issue marriage licenses to same-sex couples. On June 26, 2015, the decision of the U.S. Supreme Court in Obergefell v. Hodges invalidated the denial of marriage rights to same-sex couples, including Missouri's.

Law regarding same-sex sexual activity
Until 2006, Missouri law defined "deviate sexual intercourse" as "any act involving the genitals of one person and the hand, mouth, tongue, or anus of another person or a sexual act involving the penetration, however slight, of the male or female sex organ or the anus by a finger, instrument or object done for the purpose of arousing or gratifying the sexual desire of any person."

Missouri criminalized having "deviate sexual intercourse with another person of the same sex" as "Sexual Misconduct in the First Degree." In 1986, the Supreme Court of Missouri upheld the constitutionality of this prohibition in State v. Walsh. When the U.S. Supreme Court's 2003 decision in Lawrence v. Texas rendered laws banning consensual sexual activity unenforceable, Missouri was one of only 4 states that criminalized only homosexual sodomy.

In 2006, Missouri removed consensual sodomy from its definition of "Sexual Misconduct in the First Degree."

Recognition of same-sex relationships

In August 2004, 71% of Missouri voters ratified Amendment 2, which restricted the validity and recognition of marriage in Missouri to the union of one man and one woman. Missouri became the first of many states to pass such a referendum.

Same-sex marriage from other jurisdictions
Missouri has recognized same-sex marriages from other jurisdictions since November 2013. On November 14, 2013, Governor Jay Nixon issued an executive order allowing same-sex couples married in other jurisdictions to file a combined Missouri income tax return if they file their federal return jointly. A lawsuit aiming to reverse his order, Messer v. Nixon, was filed in Cole County Circuit Court on January 8, 2014.

The ACLU filed a lawsuit, Barrier v. Vasterling, challenging the state's refusal to recognize same-sex marriages from other jurisdictions in state circuit court on February 1, 2014. On October 3, Judge J. Dale Youngs ruled that Missouri's refusal to recognize same-sex marriages from other jurisdictions violated the plaintiffs' right to equal protection under both the state and federal constitutions. On October 6, Missouri Attorney General Chris Koster announced the state would not appeal the decision.

Lawsuits

Glossip v. Missouri Department of Transportation
Kelly Glossip sued the state for survivor benefits after the death of his husband, a highway patrol officer. After the trial court dismissed his suit, Glossip appealed to the Missouri Supreme Court. The Missouri Supreme Court ruled 5-2 against Glossip in October 2013, saying his claim was denied on the basis of his marital status, not his sexual orientation.

State of Missouri v. Florida
In June 2014, St. Louis officials licensed four same-sex marriages in order to provide the basis for a lawsuit when the state ordered them to stop the practice. St. Louis Circuit Judge Rex Burlison found for the plaintiffs on November 5, ruling that Missouri's refusal to license same-sex marriages violates the Missouri and federal constitutions. Missouri Attorney General Chris Koster did not to seek a stay of the ruling's implementation. He and the Recorders' Association of Missouri said Judge Burlison's order only applied to the city of St. Louis, where the city's marriage license department began issuing marriage licenses to same-sex couples. St. Louis County, where an official said "We believe it's a county-by-county decision", began issuing marriage licenses to same-sex couples the next day.

Lawson v. Kelly
On June 24, 2014, the ACLU filed Lawson v. Kelly in Jackson County circuit court on behalf of two same-sex couples who had been denied marriage licenses in Jackson County. Missouri Attorney General Chris Koster had the case moved to federal district court, where U.S. District Court Judge Ortrie D. Smith ruled for the plaintiffs on November 7. He ordered Jackson County to issue marriage licenses to same-sex couples, but stayed his order pending appeal. Despite the stay, Jackson County began issuing marriage licenses to same-sex couples immediately following the decision. On November 21, the plaintiffs asked Judge Smith to lift his stay in light of State of Missouri v. Florida, noting that the state has no position on the request. Attorney General Koster filed notice of appeal in the Eighth Circuit Court of Appeals on December 5.

Walsh & Nance v. Friendship Village of South County 
After a senior housing complex rejected a married lesbian couple, a housing discrimination lawsuit was filed in 2018 by the National Center for Lesbian Rights and the ACLU of Missouri. The lawsuit argued that this was a case of sex discrimination. A federal judge dismissed the case in 2019, claiming that the discrimination occurred not on the basis of sex but rather sexual orientation, and that the federal Fair Housing Act does not prohibit discrimination based on sexual orientation. The plaintiffs appealed to the 8th Circuit. The 8th Circuit has chosen to wait for the Supreme Court to issue related rulings that are expected in Spring 2020. (Those expected rulings include Altitude Express, Inc. v. Zarda, Bostock v. Clayton County, Georgia, and R.G. & G.R. Harris Funeral Homes Inc. v. Equal Employment Opportunity Commission.)

U.S. Supreme Court ruling
On June 26, 2015, the decision of the U.S. Supreme Court in Obergefell v. Hodges invalidated the denial of marriage rights to same-sex couples, making Missouri's restrictions on the licensing and recognition of same-sex marriages unenforceable. On July 7, Governor Jay Nixon issued an executive order directing all state agencies to comply with that ruling, while also rescinding his earlier, narrower executive order with respect to same-sex marriages from other jurisdictions, which his new ordered superseded.

Domestic partnership registries

A number of jurisdictions within Missouri provide domestic partnership registries which only allow for certain benefits and are only valid and applicable within city or county borders:
 City of Clayton: Residents of the city. Both opposite- and same-sex couples.
 City of Columbia: No residency requirement. Both opposite- and same-sex couples.
 Jackson County: Residents of the county. Both opposite- and same-sex couples.
 City of Kansas City: Residents of the city. Both opposite- and same-sex couples.
 City of Olivette: No residency requirement. Both opposite- and same-sex couples.
 City of St. Louis: Residents of the city. Both opposite- and same-sex couples.
 University City: Residents of the city. Both opposite- and same-sex couples.

Adoption and parenting
Missouri has no laws limiting the rights of individuals to adopt children based on the adoptive parents' LGBT status. As of 2009, with respect to same-sex couples, as well as to second-parent adoption where the second parent is the same sex as the first parent, there had been no explicit prohibitions nor any court cases. The Missouri law allowing adults to petition to adopt is MO. ANN. STAT. § 453.010.

Discrimination protection

Since 2010, an executive order was signed by the Governor of Missouri - that explicitly includes "sexual orientation protections for government based employees within Missouri". Missouri legislation does not address discrimination based on gender identity or sexual orientation whatsoever. After being proposed for nine years, a bill to add "sexual orientation" to Missouri's non-discrimination statute had its first committee hearing in March 2010. On May 17, 2013, the Senate passed legislation banning discrimination on the basis of sexual orientation in employment, housing, and public accommodations by a 19–11. The House of Representatives adjourned without considering the legislation.

Hate crime law
Missouri's hate crime statutes explicitly address both sexual orientation, defined as "male or female heterosexuality, homosexuality or bisexuality by inclination, practice, identity or expression," and gender identity, defined as "having a self-image or identity not traditionally associated with one's gender."

Public opinion
A September 2011 Public Policy Polling survey found that 32% of Missouri voters supported the legalization of same-sex marriage, while 59% were opposed and 9% were not sure. A separate question on the same survey found that 62% of respondents supported legal recognition of same-sex couples, with 28% supporting same-sex marriage, 34% supporting civil unions, 37% opposing all legal recognition and 1% not sure.

A May 2012 Public Policy Polling survey found that 36% of Missouri voters supported the legalization of same-sex marriage, while 52% were opposed and 12% were not sure. A separate question on the same survey found that 64% of respondents supported legal recognition of same-sex couples, with 33% supporting same-sex marriage, 31% supporting civil unions, 32% opposing all legal recognition and 4% not sure.

A 2017 Public Religion Research Institute (PRRI) poll found that 58% of Missouri residents supported same-sex marriage, while 35% opposed. 7% were undecided. Additionally, the same poll found that 65% of Missouri residents supported an anti-discrimination law covering sexual orientation and gender identity, while only 28% opposed. Furthermore, 54% were against allowing public businesses to refuse to serve LGBT people due to religious beliefs, while 37% supported allowing such religiously-based refusals.

Transgender Rights

Name and gender changes
On April 22, 2013, Missouri courts heard case 13AR-CV00157 about a name change due to gender transition. The amendments granted the petitioner the right to change gender with the Missouri Department of Revenue and other state identification.

On May 20, 2013 case 13AR-CV00240 was heard before the Missouri courts, with a partial delay, on the matter of gender affirmation and recognition.

Both court orders (13AR-CV00157 and 13AR-CV00240) effectively silenced Mo. Ann. Stat. § 193.215(9). The relevant ruling in 13AR-CV00240 reads:"...it is found that said request of relief is proper and that such change will not be detrimental to the interest of any persons, nor be against the interest of the state or of any given establishment ... Wherefore, the court understands that select circumstances, such as this case, require judicial intervention in order to prevent discrimination. Moreover, the explicit requirement of surgical procedures or medications that may be deemed unsuitable, dangerous, or unnecessary to the Petitioner by medical assertion shall be given relief notwithstanding Mo. Ann. Stat. § 193.215(9)..."Because of the judicial precedent established in 13AR-CV00240, many transgender individuals and lawyers are seeking similar relief in other restrictive states.

A court order will be needed with certified proof of change of sex. This certified proof will need to be printed on the hospital's official letterhead including the attending physician's licensing and contact information; also, the certification needs to state "The Petitioner's physical sex has been altered and the surgical changes are irreversible in accordance with Mo. Ann. Stat. § 193.215(9)". All amendment questions or issuance of an amended certificate of birth should be referred to the Missouri Bureau of Vital Statistics and any legal questions concerning the process should be referred to a lawyer. Any changes on the birth certificate will be noted on the original copy of the birth record and marked "amended" on the abstract copy with the corresponding authority (law) listed. The original birth certificate, not including the abstract copy, will have the old name and gender struck through with the corrected name and gender typed above the strike-through. Any challenges to this process will have to be filed in a district or federal court after a circuit court has denied petition.

Transgender youth

As of April 2021, a bill to ban transgender girls from participating in girls’ sports teams was advancing in the Missouri House of Representatives. The provision was tacked onto another House bill by a 100–51 vote. The bill died due to sin dine (adjourned) of the Missouri General Assembly.

On April 12, 2022 the house passed a bill to ban transgender individuals from female sports and athletic teams (a similar bill passed in the same House chamber last year). An amendment also passed to "legally allow random inspection of students' genitals within school districts within Missouri" - attached to a Voter Rights Bill so it had more of a chance at passing.

On April 21, 2022, the house debated House Bill 2649, which was sponsored by Representative Suzie Pollock and officially titled the "Save Adolescents from Experimentation (SAFE)" act. The bill would prevent healthcare providers from providing or referring transgender healthcare to anyone under 18, and waives insurance providers the responsibility of covering transgender healthcare. During the hearing, a psychologist named Laurie Haynes, representing, the International Federation for Therapeutic and Counseling Choice, a lobbyist organization for LGBT conversion therapy, said she supported conversion therapy and pushed for raising the age on the bill to 25. The bill runs contrary to scientific consensus and the recommendations set out by most major medical organizations in the U.S. The bill was protested by trans student activists outside the state capitol, who spoke out in support of their medical rights.

In addition, the house debated HB 1669, proposed by Brian Seitz whose second clause states that "No pupil in any public school shall be required to engage in any form of mandatory gender or sexual diversity training or counseling.

Pollock also added a companion bill, HB 2399, which would extend the window for medical malpractice suites for trans healthcare from 2 years to until the age of 28. The bill would also mandate that before anyone of any age can get trans healthcare, they must be presented with detransition statistics and "information on potential therapeutic, nonmedical approaches."

HIV law reforms 
In August 2021, Missouri passed and implemented a bill (SB53) into law to overhaul and reform HIV criminalization laws established in the 1980s - from a felony to a misdemeanor. Similar to California’s HIV law.

Summary

See also
 PROMO

References

External links
 Lawson v. Kelly, U.S. District Court for the Western District of Missouri, November 7, 2014
 A Brief History of ACLU of Missouri Cases for LGBT Equality